King Tower is a skyscraper in Shanghai, China. It is 212 m tall, has 38 stories and was completed in 1996.

The tower was the tallest in China until Shun Hing Square in Shenzhen was built later in the same year. It was the tallest building in Shanghai until the Jin Mao Tower's completion in 1998.

See also
 List of tallest buildings in Shanghai

References
 
 

Office buildings completed in 1996
Skyscraper office buildings in Shanghai